The 2023 UEFA Women's Under-17 Championship will be the 14th edition of the UEFA Women's Under-17 Championship, the annual international youth football championship organised by UEFA for the women's under-17 national teams of Europe. Estonia will host the tournament on May 14-26. It will be the first women's final tournament to be held in Estonia A total of eight teams will play in the tournament, with players born on or after 1 January 2006 eligible to participate.

Germany is the two-time defending champions.

Qualification

48 (out of 55) UEFA nations entered the qualifying competition, with the hosts Estonia also competing despite already qualifying automatically, and seven teams will qualify for the final tournament at the end of round 2 to join the hosts. The draw for round 1 was held on 31 May 2022, at the UEFA headquarters in Nyon, Switzerland.

Qualified teams
The following teams qualified for the final tournament.

1 Bold indicates champions for that year. Italic indicates hosts for that year.

Venues
To be determined.

Squads
Each national team have to submit a squad of 20 players, two of whom had to be goalkeepers (Regulations Article 44.01).

Group stage
The group winners and runners-up advanced to the semi-finals.

Tiebreakers
In the group stage, teams were ranked according to points (3 points for a win, 1 point for a draw, 0 points for a loss), and if tied on points, the following tiebreaking criteria were applied, in the order given, to determine the rankings (Regulations Articles 20.01 and 20.02):
Points in head-to-head matches among tied teams;
Goal difference in head-to-head matches among tied teams;
Goals scored in head-to-head matches among tied teams;
If more than two teams were tied, and after applying all head-to-head criteria above, a subset of teams were still tied, all head-to-head criteria above were reapplied exclusively to that subset of teams;
Goal difference in all group matches;
Goals scored in all group matches;
Penalty shoot-out if only two teams had the same number of points, and they met in the last round of the group and were tied after applying all criteria above (not used if more than two teams had the same number of points, or if their rankings were not relevant for qualification for the next stage);
Disciplinary points (red card = 3 points, yellow card = 1 point, expulsion for two yellow cards in one match = 3 points);
Higher position in the qualification round 2 league ranking

All times are local, CEST (UTC+2).

Group A

Group B

Knockout stage
In the knockout stage, penalty shoot-out wull be used to decide the winner if necessary (no extra time was played).

Bracket

Semi-finals

Final

Goalscorers

References

External links

2023
Women's Under-17 Championship
2023 Uefa Women's Under-17 Championship
2023 in women's association football
2023 in youth association football
UEFA